"You didn't build that" is a phrase from a 2012 election campaign speech delivered by United States President Barack Obama on July 13, 2012, in Roanoke, Virginia. In the speech, Obama stated, "Somebody helped to create this unbelievable American system that we have that allowed you to thrive. Somebody invested in roads and bridges. If you've got a business, you didn't build that." The sentence "If you've got a business, you didn't build that" was publicized by his political opponents during the 2012 presidential campaign, as an attack by Obama on business and entrepreneurs. The Obama campaign responded that the criticisms were taking the phrase out of context, and the word "that" in the phrase was referring to the construction of "roads and bridges" in the previous sentence.

Fact-checking organizations reported that Obama's remarks were incorrectly used out of context in order to criticize the president. The Washington Post commented that the president's remarks reflected the belief, common among Democrats, that successful citizens owed their success partly to public infrastructure and government spending, and that they should contribute to finance public works.

The Republican Party continued to use the phrase to criticize Obama throughout the 2012 presidential campaign.

Background
In August 2011, while contemplating a run for the U.S. Senate, former White House financial reform adviser Elizabeth Warren gave a defense of progressive economic theory at an event in Andover, Massachusetts. On September 21, a video of Warren making the case for progressive economics received attention on the Internet and became a viral video. In the video, Warren aggressively rebuts the argument that asking the rich to pay more taxes is "class warfare", by arguing that no one grew rich in America without depending on government services paid for by the rest of society. Warren said:

Obama later echoed Warren's thoughts when he spoke in Roanoke, Virginia about how private businesses rely on government investments in infrastructure. In her victory speech on November 6, 2012, after winning the Senate election in Massachusetts, Elizabeth Warren made a callback, stating that it had been "an amazing campaign, and let me be clear, I didn't build that, you built that."

Speech
On July 13, 2012, during a campaign swing through Virginia, Obama stopped in Roanoke to speak to supporters. In his remarks Obama noted that while he was willing to cut government waste, he would not gut investments that grow the economy or give tax breaks to millionaires like himself or Mitt Romney. Obama went on to say that rich people did not get rich solely due to their own talent and hard work, but that, to varying degrees, they owe some of their success to good fortune and the contributions of government. Obama said in this context:

Obama then cited the funding of the G.I. Bill, the creation of the middle class, the construction of the Golden Gate Bridge and Hoover Dam, creation of the Internet, and landing on the moon as examples of what he was talking about.

Campaign statements

Romney campaign
The following Monday, July 16, former Massachusetts governor Mitt Romney spoke about the "you didn't build that" statement in a campaign stump speech. The following day, Romney rebuffed Obama's statement in Pennsylvania by saying:

This was followed by campaign events with small business owners in multiple states (Pennsylvania, Wisconsin, Virginia, Ohio, Iowa, Missouri, North Carolina, Michigan, New Hampshire, New Mexico and Nevada); two small business owners who spoke at one of the campaign events in Florida have government contracts. A new part of the Romney campaign website was created, and merchandise related to the statement was produced.

The second day of the 2012 Republican National Convention was themed "We Built It" as both a celebration of small businesses and an attack on Obama's comments. Salon, Political Wire, and a humor website later commented on the fact that the stadium where the GOP hosted the "We Built It" theme at the convention was constructed using 62% taxpayer financing. Country music singer Lane Turner also performed a song at the event inspired from the speech called "I Built It".

Obama campaign
On July 17, 2012, the Obama campaign stated that the statement was taken out of context, and that the phrase referred to "roads and bridges" from the previous sentence. As the statement gained traction, the campaign ran new ads in multiple states (Virginia, North Carolina, Florida, Ohio, Iowa, and Nevada) where the President directly countered Romney's claims. In the ad Obama says while looking directly at the camera: 

While speaking at the Oregon Convention Center in Portland, Oregon, on July 24, Obama rebuked the Romney campaign by saying:

Response
Although the remark was not initially seen as significant, it soon gained traction among Republicans, and was used as a hashtag on Twitter. The phrase was used by the Romney campaign to build a political meme. The Washington Post identified the quote in full in the Top 10 political quotes of 2012 in their article of December 28, 2012.

Conservative commentators
An opinion piece in The Wall Street Journal on July 17, 2012, stated that the speech is a "burst of ideological candor" and that the statement meant that "the self-made man is an illusion". In another Wall Street Journal piece, James Taranto wrote that "The president's remark was a direct attack on the principle of individual responsibility, the foundation of American freedom." Later, Kimberley Strassel wrote that the portion of the speech that spoke about Obama's views on the relationship between business and government was similar to statements made by Massachusetts Senate candidate Elizabeth Warren and that the effect of the speech was to "suck away the president's momentum".

In The Washington Post, Jennifer Rubin wrote that the statement showed that Obama "revealed a level of resentment toward the private sector that was startling, even to his critics", and that the speech reflects that "the anti-business assaults become the campaign. Meanwhile, his affection for government becomes a chip on his shoulder, prompting him to dare those private-sector wise guys to deny the centrality of government in their success." Glenn Kessler later said that the Obama statement was taken out of context and that he was speaking about higher taxes for the wealthy, comparing individual initiative to the system of many people working to create supporting infrastructure.

In The Atlantic, Andrew Cline wrote that what Obama said was an "enormous controversy – a philosophical rewriting of the American story" and that "With his Roanoke speech, Obama turned Jefferson on his head. In Obama's formulation, government is not a tool for the people's use, but the very foundation upon which all of American prosperity is built. Government is not dependent upon the people; the people are dependent upon the government." This, Cline writes, is fundamentally non-Jeffersonian. Earlier in the same publication, Clive Crook wrote that Obama's statements did not mean what his critics wrote they meant, but that the caricature resonates due to it being recognizable as part of his theme of the "rich aren't paying their fair share". Jonah Goldberg, in the National Review, wrote that Obama's "gaffe" was at best truism, and the reason for Obama's supporters attacking others, for taking Obama's words and progressive roots seriously, is because they do not portray Obama as a pragmatist and a moderate.

Guy Benson, on Townhall.com, wrote that the Romney campaign did not take Obama's words out of context since "Obama essentially posits that no private or individual success is possible in America without the government's help." Rachael Larimore, in Slate, wrote that it didn't matter what Obama meant to say, as conservatives heard "You didn't get credit for your hard work", and even with the context of the entire speech, the reaction would be largely the same. More importantly, it damaged his relations with small-business owners. Rush Limbaugh commented that business owners did build the roads and bridges through their taxes, and that Obama wants to socialize private profit. Mark Levin, in reaction to the speech, said that Obama was "disrespecting the American people" and that "he despises the capitalist system". Josh Barro, in Bloomberg, wrote that Obama's speech was needlessly insulting, and that the statement resonated badly with people of all income levels.

Liberal commentators
In researching the 2002 Winter Olympics, NBC News' Domenico Montanaro posited that Romney had made a similar statement during his speech during those games' opening ceremony, where he said:

In The Huffington Post, Michael Smerconish wrote that the Romney campaign did take the words out of context, and that the message of the importance of social contracts was better worded by Warren. Nelson Davis, president of Nelson Davis Productions, rebuked the conservatives' take on what Obama had said in Roanoke, saying that the reason why the United States has become great is due to business and government working together. Keeping with the "You didn't build that" meme, Alan Colmes wrote that Romney will not have sewed his suit, would not have built the stage used during the 2012 Republican National Convention in Tampa Bay, Florida, and that his success at Bain Capital would not have been possible without government assistance. Anthony Gregory, of The Independent Institute, wrote that the implication of the speech was that the "state protects business interests so taxpayers have a partial claim on the wealth produced." Michael Cohen writing for The Guardian stated that the Republicans' usage of the phrase exemplifies that they "not only toil in their own narrowly and misleadingly constructed world, but really are just making stuff up."

In the New York Magazine, Jonathan Chait wrote that Romney's use of the words from the Roanoke speech as a "plan of blatantly lying" about it, and the reason why it works is because of a "broader subtext" of the speech due to Obama not using his normal voice, but speaking with a "black dialect". In Bloomberg Businessweek, Charles Kenny of the Center for Global Development also criticized the Romney campaign for taking the word out of context, and went on to state that American businesses benefit from infrastructure, and other elements of the "system" that Obama was speaking about in the speech. Media Matters made several posts targeting Fox News, and other news sources that Media Matters claimed were using Obama's words out of context through "deceptive" editing. Ezra Klein, on The Rachel Maddow Show, said that the political statements made in the Roanoke speech were not particularly controversial, and that people rely on others and themselves.

Fact-checking organizations
FactCheck.org said that the Romney campaign and Republicans have used quotations from the speech out of context, failing to include Obama's remarks about how infrastructure and education promote business success. In an update to the post, responses from the Obama campaign were added, explaining the president's intended meanings of infrastructure and education. FactCheck.org said "We don't know what the president had in mind when he uttered those words, and his intent is not clear. Regardless, our conclusion is the same: Taking snippets of his speech ignores the larger context of the president's meaning that a business owner does not become successful 'on your own.'" Romney was commended, however, for acknowledging Obama's wider context in a July 17 campaign speech Romney gave criticizing Obama's "You didn't build that" remark.

Politifact also criticized Romney advertisements, saying that the Romney campaign, "cherry-picked a quote that made it sound like Obama was dismissive of businesses when in fact he was making a point that success comes from the combination of 'individual initiative' and the fact that 'we do things together'", and that by doing so "Romney and his supporters have misled viewers and given a false impression."

Comedic commentators
On The Daily Show, a news satire program, Jon Stewart said that the Romney campaign was centering its campaign on a grammatical misstep taken out of context; he additionally said that both campaigns are guilty of focusing on gaffes, though Romney had taken it "one giant step further". On The Colbert Report, another news satire program, Stephen Colbert attempted to demonstrate that he is the only one responsible for his show's success by doing a segment of the program as a one man show, using an iPhone, desk lamp, and a whiteboard. "It didn't go so well", Meredith Blake of the LA Times reported. On The Tonight Show, Jay Leno during his opening monologue made a play on Obama's statement in regards to unemployment. Additionally, the controversy created by the speech has become the subject of numerous editorial cartoons.

References

External links
C-SPAN video of entire speech
White House transcript of entire speech

2012 speeches
2012 controversies in the United States
2012 in Virginia
American political catchphrases
Barack Obama controversies
Barack Obama 2012 presidential campaign
Criticism of capitalism
Political controversies in the United States
Speeches by Barack Obama